Fail Farasatovich Mirgalimov (born 29 March 1957) is a Russian football manager and a former player who manages FC Sakhalin Yuzhno-Sakhalinsk.

External links
 

1957 births
Sportspeople from Chelyabinsk
Living people
Soviet footballers
FC Ural Yekaterinburg players
FC Lokomotiv Moscow players
FC Tyumen players
FC Ordabasy players
Navbahor Namangan players
FC Halychyna Drohobych players
Russian footballers
Russian expatriate footballers
Expatriate footballers in Poland
Russian football managers
FC Spartak Moscow players
Association football forwards